This page lists Welsh architects. People have also been included who were born outside Wales but who are primarily known for their practice within Wales.

18th century 

 Lloyd Hesketh Bamford-Hesketh (1788–1861), attributed with the design of Gwrych Castle.
 William Edwards (1719–1789), stonemason, architect and bridge designer.
 George Maddox (1760–1843), born in Monmouth.
 John Nash (1752–1835), family connection to Wales, lived and worked in Wales from 1784.

19th century 

 Benjamin Gummow
 Lloyd Williams and Underwood
 George Vaughan Maddox
 Jacob Owen
 Richard Owens
 Richard Kyrke Penson
 Thomas Penson
 John Prichard
 Edwin Seward
 William Henry Skinner
 Talhaiarn
 Thomas Thomas
 E. M. Bruce Vaughan
 Edward Welch
 George Wightwick
 Stephen W. Williams

20th century 

 Jonathan Adams
 Ianto Evans
 Sidney Colwyn Foulkes
 Alex Gordon
 George Francis Grimwood (1874–1938), Cardiff and Monmouth architect. 
 Harold Hughes
 Thomas Alwyn Lloyd
 Ernest Morgan
 Dale Owen
 Malcolm Parry
 Gwynne Pugh, born in Cardiff, though largely active in California, USA
 Beddoe Rees
 Giuseppe Rinvolucri
 David Wyn Roberts
 Edwin Seward
 Alwyn Sheppard Fidler
 Dewi-Prys Thomas
 Percy Thomas
 E. M. Bruce Vaughan
 James Grey West
 Clough Williams-Ellis 
 Reginald Wynn Owen

21st century 

 Jonathan Adams
 Ianto Evans

 Malcolm Parry

See also 

 Architecture of Wales

References 

Welsh architects
Architecture in Wales